National Road 1 (alternatively marked as M-1, M1 and M 1), was a road in Serbia, connecting Croatia at Batrovci with North Macedonia at Tabanovce. The route was a part of a notably larger motorway which existed during SFR Yugoslavia, generally known as Brotherhood and Unity Highway (/), therefore considered as the most important route in Serbia.

After the new road categorization regulation given in 2013, the route bears designations A3 and A1. The road was a dual-carriageway motorway.

Sections

See also 
 Roads in Serbia

References

External links 
 Official website – Roads of Serbia (Putevi Srbije)
 Official website – Corridors of Serbia (Koridori Srbije) (Serbian)

Roads in Serbia